Emptiness is the state of being empty, i.e., not containing anything.

Hence, the term may refer metaphorically to several things:
 A blank information carrier, like an empty sheet of paper or an empty hard disk
 An empty data structure, such as an empty string
 In Buddhism, "emptiness" is called Śūnyatā
 In set theory, emptiness is symbolized by the empty set: a set that contains no elements
 Lack of matter, or vacuum

Emptiness or The Emptiness may also refer to:
 Emptiness (film), a 2020 film
 The Emptiness (album), a 2010 album released by post-hardcore band Alesana
 Emptiness (Chinese constellation), a Chinese star constellation
 "Emptiness", a song by electronic music artist Slushii
 "Emptiness", a song by Taiwanese singer Jolin Tsai for the 1999 studio album 1019